Tal Qasab  (also Tal Qassab, Tel Qasab or Tel Kassab, ; , also known in Arabic as Baath) is a village located in the Sinjar District of the Ninawa Governorate in  Iraq. The village is located south of the Sinjar Mount. It belongs to the disputed territories of Northern Iraq.

Tal Qasab is populated by Yazidis.

References

Populated places in Nineveh Governorate
Yazidi populated places in Iraq